Parliamentary elections were held in Finland on 15 and 16 March 1987.

The results saw a rightwards shift in Finnish politics, although it was uncertain how far, because the voter turnout — at a comparatively low 75% — hurt the left more than the right and had a variable impact. The centre-right National Coalition Party (KOK) increased its vote share by only 1% yet gained nine seats in the Eduskunta, almost overtaking the Social Democratic Party (SDP) as the largest party. The SDP vote share dropped by 3%, with 100,000 fewer votes, yet they lost only one seat due to the way their votes were distributed across the country. The Centre Party's vote share remained stable and it gained two new seats. The Greens, who had registered a significant gain in the 1984 municipal elections gained two seats, far fewer than expected. Weakened perhaps from its membership in the long-lived government, the Finnish Rural Party (SMP) lost more than one-third of its support and almost half of its seats.

Results

Aftermath
Faced with these inconclusive results, negotiations about the shape of the new government began. After six weeks of talks and attempts to put together a completely non-socialist government, a pathbreaking combination was formed that included conservatives and socialists in the Council of State, joined by the dependable and successful Swedish People's Party and the battered and desperate SMP.

The new government, consisting of nine centrist and conservative and eight socialist ministers and headed by the KOK's Harri Holkeri, surprised some observers because a non-socialist government was possible and seemed appropriate given the election results. The outcome angered others, who contended that Koivisto had misused presidential powers when he brokered a government that had his former party as a member despite its considerable electoral losses. Koivisto countered that he had behaved properly and had let the parties themselves argue out a workable combination.

One explanation for the unusual government was that animosity against the Centre Party (Kesk) leader, Paavo Väyrynen, was so common in both the SDP and the KOK that neither party was willing to form a government with him. Thus, Kesk was deprived of its traditional "hinge" role. Another consideration was that the SDP and the KOK were not so much at odds with each another as socialist and conservative parties elsewhere might have been. Both parties had moved toward the centre, and they were in agreement about most issues, especially about the need to reduce the agricultural subsidies that had always been defended by Kesk. The resulting "red-blue" government had as program objective the preservation of the social welfare system, the improvement of Finland's competitive position in international trade, a fundamental reform of the tax system, and adherence to the Paasikivi-Kekkonen Line in foreign affairs. The SFP fitted in easily with this program. The formerly rightist, but now moderate, SMP was included because it strengthened the government slightly and because it was likely to be dependable, because it had no other place to go. Koivisto informed the new government that it would not have to resign after the presidential election of 1988, and observers expected the cabinet to serve its full term until the 1991 parliamentary elections.

References

1987
Finland
Parliament
Finland
Election and referendum articles with incomplete results